Tatiana is a crime novel by Martin Cruz Smith set in Russia. It is the eighth novel to feature Detective-Investigator Arkady Renko, published 32 years after the initial novel of the Renko series, Gorky Park.

Plot

One of the iconic investigators of contemporary fiction, Arkady Renko —cynical, analytical, and quietly subversive— has survived the cultural journey from the Soviet Union to the New Russia, only to find the nation as obsessed with secrecy and brutality as was the old Communist regime. In Tatiana, Martin Cruz Smith's most ambitious novel since Gorky Park, the melancholy hero finds himself on the trail of a mystery as complex and dangerous as modern Russia herself.

The fearless investigative reporter Tatiana Petrovna falls to her death from a sixth-story window in Moscow the same week that a mob billionaire, Grisha Grigorenko, is shot and buried with the trappings afforded minor royalty. No one makes the connection, but Arkady is transfixed by the tapes he discovers of Tatiana's voice, even as she describes horrific crimes concealed by official cover stories.

The trail leads to Kaliningrad, a Cold War "secret city" and home of the Baltic Fleet, separated by hundreds of miles from the rest of Russia. Arkady delves into Tatiana's past and a surreal world of wandering dunes and amber mines. His only link is a notebook written in the personal code of a translator whose body is found in the dunes. Arkady's only hope of decoding the symbols lies in Zhenya, a gifted teenage chess hustler.

The story was inspired by the murder of Russian journalist Anna Politkovskaya in 2006.

References

External links
 Martin Cruz Smith official site

2013 American novels
Arkady Renko
Novels by Martin Cruz Smith
Novels set in Moscow
Simon & Schuster books
Macmillan Publishers books